Ambuchananiaceae is a family of moss in the order Sphagnales with only two genera, Ambuchanania and Eosphagnum.

References

Moss families
Sphagnales